De Dominicis is an Italian surname. Spellings include De Dominicis, de Dominicis, and DeDominicis. Notable people with the surname include:

 Domenico de Dominicis (died 1478), Italian bishop
 Gino De Dominicis (1947–1998), Italian artist 
 Luca De Dominicis (born 1973), Italian actor

See also
Dominici (surname)

Italian-language surnames
Patronymic surnames
Surnames from given names